Cnaphalocrocis poeyalis, the lesser rice-leafroller, is a species of moth of the family Crambidae described by Jean Baptiste Boisduval in 1833. They can be found from Africa to the Pacific region, including Australia, Réunion, India, Fiji, Hong Kong and French Polynesia.

Their wingspan is about 20 mm.

Nutrition
They feed on grasses (Poaceae) and are a pest of rice (Oryza sativa).

References 

Moths of Australia
Spilomelinae
Moths of Africa
Moths of Cape Verde
Moths of the Comoros
Moths of Japan
Moths of Madagascar
Moths of Mauritius
Moths of Réunion
Moths described in 1833